Bible Black is a 2000 eroge video game franchise that includes several anime adaptations. 

Bible Black may refer to:

"Bible Black" (song), a song by Heaven & Hell
Bible Black (band), a 1980s band
Bible Black: Five Days with Andrew Mackenzie, a 2008 documentary by Tao Nørager

See also
Starless and Bible Black, an album by King Crimson
Starless and Bible Black Sabbath, an album by The Acid Mothers Temple and the Cosmic Inferno
Black Bible Chronicles, vernacular translation of the Bible